Werner Perathoner (born September 21, 1967) is an Italian former Alpine skier, who specialized in downhill and super-G disciplines.

Although he is also from South Tyrol, he is not a relative of the other Italian skier Lukas Perathoner.

Biography
Born in Selva di Val Gardena, in the Province of Bolzano, he obtained his first podium in World Cup in 1988, at the Leukerbad downhill, one of his country's most memorable races ever with three Italians occupying the whole podium. A victim of numerous accidents, he won two World Cup races, both in Super-G.

He competed at the 1994 and 1998 Winter Olympics.

World Cup victories

References

External links
 

1967 births
Living people
Sportspeople from Brixen
Ladin people
Italian male alpine skiers
Alpine skiers at the 1994 Winter Olympics
Alpine skiers at the 1998 Winter Olympics
Olympic alpine skiers of Italy
Alpine skiers of Centro Sportivo Carabinieri